Nikolas Petrik (born March 19, 1984) is an Austrian former professional ice hockey forward who played in the Austrian Hockey League (EBEL).

Playing career
He began his professional career playing exclusively with EC VSV before later joining Dornbirner EC on August 10, 2012.

After five seasons with Dornbirner, Petrik returned to Captain and join brother Benjamin at EC VSV, in signing a two-year contract on March 27, 2017.

Having played 12 out of his 18 professional seasons with Villach, Petrik announced his retirement following the 2018–19 season, remaining with EC VSV in accepting the position of athletic trainer on 4 April 2019.

International play
He participated with the Austrian national team at the 2015 IIHF World Championship.

References

External links

1984 births
Living people
Austrian ice hockey forwards
Dornbirn Bulldogs players
Graz 99ers players
EC VSV players
Sportspeople from Villach